The Division of Sydney is an Australian electoral division in the state of New South Wales.

History

The division draws its name from Sydney, the most populous city in Australia, which itself was named after former British Home Secretary Thomas Townshend, 1st Viscount Sydney. The division was proclaimed at the redistribution of 21 November 1968, replacing the old Division of Dalley, Division of East Sydney and Division of West Sydney, and was first contested at the 1969 election.

The seat is a safe Labor seat; the Labor Party has never polled less than 60% of the two-party preferred vote at any election. Following a national trend towards progressive inner-city voting, the seat had the highest number of Green votes in any federal electorate in 2004, though by 2013 it had dropped to seventh-highest. The current Member for the Division of Sydney, since the 1998 federal election, is Tanya Plibersek, a member of the Australian Labor Party and former Deputy Leader of the Opposition. Sydney is currently Labor's third safest seat, with 68.67% on the 2PP.

As at the 2001 census, the electorate had the highest number of same-sex couples in Australia.

Boundaries
Since 1984, federal electoral division boundaries in Australia have been determined at redistributions by a redistribution committee appointed by the Australian Electoral Commission. Redistributions occur for the boundaries of divisions in a particular state, and they occur every seven years, or sooner if a state's representation entitlement changes or when divisions of a state are malapportioned.

Members

Election results

References

External links
 Division of Sydney - Australian Electoral Commission

Electoral divisions of Australia
Constituencies established in 1969
1969 establishments in Australia